Mohalla Assi is a 2018 Indian Hindi-language satirical drama film starring Sunny Deol and Sakshi Tanwar, and directed by  Dr. Chandraprakash Dwivedi.

The film is loosely based on Dr. Kashi Nath Singh's popular Hindi novel Kashi Ka Assi, a satire on the commercialisation of the pilgrimage city, and fake gurus who lure the foreign tourists. Assi Ghat is a ghat in Varanasi (Banaras) on the banks of Ganges River, and the film is based in a famous and historical 'Mohalla' (locality) by the ghat, on the southern end of Banaras. Also starring Ravi Kishen and Sakshi Tanwar, the film is set in the post-independence period.

Sunny Deol plays the lead role of Sanskrit teacher and an orthodox religious priest (Pandit) while Sakshi Tanwar plays his wife. The story of the film goes through the events in 1990 and 1989 including Ram Janmabhoomi movement and Mandal Commission implementation.

On 30 June 2015, the release of Mohalla Assi was stayed by a Delhi court for allegedly hurting religious sentiments. After several delays, Mohalla Assi finally released on 16 November 2018.

Cast
 Sunny Deol as Pandey Ji
 Sakshi Tanwar as Savitri 
 Ravi Kishan as Kanni Guru
 Saurabh Shukla as Upadhyay
 Mukesh Tiwari as Radheshyam
 Rajendra Gupta as Virendra Srivastava
 Akhilendra Mishra as Tanni Guru
 Seema Azmi as Ramdayi
 Mithilesh Chaturvedi as Gaya Singh(Retired Principal)
 Faisal Rashid as Nakka
 Davinder Singh
 Mohit Sinha
 Naresh Jang' Vaibhav Mishra
 Shrichand Makhija
 Md. Rahman Jony

 Ishtiyaq Anas (Akram Ishtiyaq)
 Daya Shankar Pandey as Shiva Imposter
 Mukesh Tiwari as Radheshyam

Production
Dwivedi had previously directed Pinjar (2003), starring Urmila Matondkar and Manoj Bajpayee, and most known for television epic Chanakya. Ameesha Patel was offered the female lead role but turned it down because of financial differences with the film's producer. Sakshi Tanwar was cast as her replacement.

The principal photography of the film started on 28 January 2011 on the sets erected at the Film City, Mumbai, later scenes were also shot in Varanasi where film is set.

ReleaseMohalla Assi'' was initially delayed for three years as the film director had stopped the work claiming that he had not been paid his dues, The release date of Mohalla Assi has been repeatedly pushed back and allegations of non-payment have continued to surface through 2012.

 However, the film is now ready for release in October–November 2015.

After extended delays, on 12 June 2015 film's trailer was released, ahead on its late 2015 release. Shortly after, an FIR was filed in Varanasi against Deol and Dwivedi for the alleged use of abusive language in the film.

The film has been banned by the CBFC on 8 April 2016.

On 11 December 2017, Delhi High Court allowed the release of the film with one cut and adult certification, setting aside the order of CBFC. 
. After so many delays, Sunny Deol announced the release date on 21 September 2018. It was released on 16 November 2018.

Online piracy issue
Prior to its release Mohalla Assi leaked online on 11 August 2015.

Critical reception
It received negative reviews from critics. Jyoti Sharma Bawa of Hindustan Times stated that Mohalla Assi is a delight to watch film and gave it 2 out of 5 stars. Kunal Guha of Mumbai Mirror stated the film is a beautiful and realistic depiction of Varanasi's issues and gave it 1.5 out of 5 star. Troy Ribeiro of News18 stated that the film is verbose yet important and gave it 2 stars. Reza Noorani of Times of India stated "At two hours of runtime, 'Mohalla Assi' feels more like an anti-tourism commercial rather than a feature film" and gave it 2 stars.

Box office

Mohalla Assi collected around 1.30 crore on first day. The fim grossed  14.49 crore in its first weekend in India. and lifetime 18.57cr.

Soundtrack

The songs of the film are composed by Amod Bhatt while lyrics are written by Gulzar.

References

External links
 
 

2018 films
2010s satirical films
Indian satirical films
2010s Hindi-language films
Films based on Indian novels
Films set in Uttar Pradesh
Films set in 1989
Films directed by Chandraprakash Dwivedi